Jaime Villegas (born 1937) is a former Colombian cyclist. He competed in the individual and team road race events at the 1956 Summer Olympics.

References

External links
 

1937 births
Living people
Colombian male cyclists
Olympic cyclists of Colombia
Cyclists at the 1956 Summer Olympics
Place of birth missing (living people)
20th-century Colombian people